The following is a list of Italian language endonyms for towns and villages in Istria.
Istra Istria itself
Babiči Babici
Bale Valle
Barban Barbana
Baredina Baredina
Bašanija Bassania
Bergod
Bertoki Bertocchi
Boljun Bogliuno
Brda Colatto
Brovinje Brovigne
Bersez
Brtonigla Verteneglio
Buje Buie
Buzet Pinguente
Bužinija Butinia
Čepić Cepici, Ceppich
Cerovizza Cerovica
Chermenizza
Cugn
Diminiči St Lorenzo d'Albona
Dubrova Dobrova
Fianona Plomin
Fažana Fasana d'Istria
Crovizza
Funtana Fontane
Galižana Gallesano
Gamboči Gambozzi
Gomila Gomila
Gračiśče Gallignana
Grožnjan Grisignana
Ičići Icici
Ika Ika
Izola Isola d'Istria
Juricani Giurizzani
Kaldanija Caldania
Kanfanar Canfanaro
Karšete Carsette
Kastav Castua
Kastel Castelvenere
Karvran Carnizza
Koper Capodistria
Koromačno Valmazzinghi
Labin  Albona
Lindar Lindaro
Lovran Lovrana, Laurana
Lovrečice San Lorenzo
Lucija Santa Lucia
Nova Vas Villa Nova
Novigrad Cittanova
Martinčići Martincici
Marušići Marusici
Matulji Mattuglie
Medulin Medolino
Merišće Merischie
Mošćenice Moschenizze, Moschiena
Momjan Momiano
Motovun Montona
Opatija Abbazia
Oprtalj Portole
Pazin Pisino
Pelegrin San Pellegrino
Petrovija Petrovia
Piran Pirano
Poreč Parenzo
Portorož Portorose
Premantura Promontore
Pula Pola
Plavje Plavia Montedoro
Rabac Rabaz, Porto Albona
Radini Radini
Rijeka Fiume
Rippenda
Roč Rozzo
Rovinj Rovigno
Rovinjsko Selo Villa di Rovigno
Savudrija Salvore
Sovinjak Sovignacco
Štinjan Stignano
Susak Sansego
S.Domenica
S.Martin
Sv Lovreč Labinski San Lorenzo d'Albona
Sv Lovreč Pazenatički San Lorenzo del Pasenatico
Sv Petar u Sumi San Pietro in Selve
Skitača Schitazza
Tar Torre
Tinjan Antignana
Triban Tribano
Umag Umago
Unije Unie
Vabriga Abrega
Valica Valizza
Vettua
Vilanja Villania
Višnjan Visignano
Viškovići Viscovici
Vižinada Visinada
Vlakovo Vlahova
Vlakovo Vlacovi, Istria
Vodnjan Dignano d'Istria
Volosko Volosca
Vrsar Orsera
Zambratija Zambrattia
Žbandaj Sbandati
Žminj Gimino
Zrenj Stridone

See also 
 Istria on the Internet - Master Town List
 Italian exonyms
 List of European exonyms
 List of Italian exonyms in Dalmatia

Istria
Istria
Italian language
Croatia geography-related lists
Slovenia geography-related lists
Lists of exonyms
Names of places in Slovenia
Istria